Tennessee School for the Blind (Braille: ⠠⠠⠠⠞⠢⠰⠎⠑⠑⠀⠎⠡⠕⠕⠇⠀⠿⠀⠮⠀⠃⠇⠠⠄, TSB, ⠞⠎⠃) is a K–12 school for blind children in Clover Bottom, Nashville, Tennessee. It is overseen by the Tennessee Department of Education.

It was previously in Rolling Mill Hill.

History
In the era of de jure educational segregation in the United States the school separated black students from white ones. Initially the campus on Hermitage Avenue was reserved for white students, but when the Donelson campus opened, the black students moved to Hermitage, which began educating black students in 1944. A Victorian mansion in Hermitage was the classroom site for white students. The Hermitage campus has Colonial revival architecture.

The school racially integrated in 1965, with all students moved to Donelson. An alumnus, Ralph Brewer, stated that he did not recall problems that occurred as a result of desegregation.

The State of Tennessee continued to own the disused Hermitage campus. Alumni of TSB argued for preserving the property after the Nashville Metropolitan government made a proposal to demolish it so it could build the Nashville School of the Arts there. In 2017 the Tennessee Historical Commission ruled that it was eligible to be a historic property. Historic Nashville Inc. made efforts to help preserve the property.

Student body
In 1965 the school had 150 white students and 30 black students.

Campus
The school has dormitory facilities.

See also

 Tennessee School for the Deaf
 West Tennessee School for the Deaf

References

Further reading

External links
 Tennessee School for the Blind (current website)
 Tennessee School for the Blind (older website)

Schools in Nashville, Tennessee
Public K-12 schools in the United States
Public elementary schools in Tennessee
Public middle schools in Tennessee
Public high schools in Tennessee
K-12 schools in Tennessee
Schools for the blind in the United States
Public boarding schools in the United States
Boarding schools in Tennessee